William D. Mounce (born 17 February 1953) is a scholar of New Testament Greek.

William Mounce is the son of a noted scholar Robert H. Mounce. He lives as a writer in Washougal, Washington. He is the President of Biblical Training, a non-profit organization offering educational resources for discipleship in the local church. He also runs Teknia, a site committed to helping people learn New Testament Greek. At his personal site, he also wrote blogs like:

Monday with Mounce, which discusses issues of Greek translation
Life as a Journey, which covers spiritual issues specifically connected to new Christians

He was a preaching pastor at a church in Spokane, WA, and prior to that a professor of New Testament and director of the Greek Program at Gordon-Conwell Theological Seminary. He also taught at Azusa Pacific University for ten years. Mounce authored the bestselling Greek textbook, Basics of Biblical Greek, which won a 2003 Reader's Preference Editor's Choice Award in the Sacred Texts category. . He was the New Testament chair of the English Standard Version translation of the Bible, and serves on the NIV translation committee. Bill and Robin have been married since 1983 and have three adult children.

Education 

Ph.D. 1981, in New Testament. Aberdeen University, Aberdeen, Scotland.
M.A. 1977, in Biblical Studies. Fuller Theological Seminary, Pasadena, California.
B.A. 1975, in Biblical Studies, minor in Greek. Bethel College, St. Paul, Minnesota; Western Kentucky University, Bowling Green, Kentucky, 1971-74.

Works

External links 

Textbook site
Institute of Theological Studies's mini-bio

Living people
People from Washougal, Washington
American biblical scholars
New Testament scholars
Scholars of Koine Greek
1953 births
Western Kentucky University alumni
Bethel University (Minnesota) alumni
Fuller Theological Seminary alumni
Alumni of the University of Aberdeen
Azusa Pacific University faculty
Gordon–Conwell Theological Seminary faculty
Translators of the Bible into English